The Finnish Wikipedia is the edition of Wikipedia in the Finnish language. Wikipedia is the only encyclopedia in Finnish which is still updated.

The Finnish language project was started in late 2002, but it remained at a very primitive stage until well into 2003. The speed of development picked up somewhat after the MediaWiki software was upgraded to Phase III in late November 2003, and continued to increase steadily through 2004.

In 2013 the reliability of the Finnish Wikipedia was investigated by the newspaper Helsingin Sanomat. The researchers used experts to evaluate quality of randomly selected 134 articles and found that 70% of the articles scored well for accuracy.

Milestones
 500,000 articles - December 28, 2020
 450,000 articles - January 12, 2019
 400,000 articles - August 29, 2016
 350,000 articles - July 9, 2014
 300,000 articles - June 26, 2012
 250,000 articles - September 24, 2010
 200,000 articles - April 12, 2009
 150,000 articles - February 4, 2008
 100,000 articles - February 11, 2007
 50,000 articles - February 21, 2006
 15,000 articles - February 9, 2005
 5,000 articles - April 15, 2004
 1,000 articles - September, 2002

Gallery

References

External links

  Finnish Wikipedia
  Finnish Wikipedia mobile version
 Report from the Finnish Wikipedia, from Wikipedia Signpost (in English Wikipedia), 2006-10-23.

Finnish-language encyclopedias
Wikipedias by language
Internet properties established in 2002
Finnish-language websites
Finnish encyclopedias